The Conspiracy is a 1796 tragedy by the Irish writer Robert Jephson.

The original cast included John Palmer as Titus, John Philip Kemble as Sextus, William Barrymore as Annius, Charles Kemble as Publius, Thomas Caulfield as Lentulus, Jane Powell as Cornelia and Sarah Siddons as Vitellia.

References

Bibliography
 Nicoll, Allardyce. A History of English Drama 1660–1900: Volume III. Cambridge University Press, 2009.
 Hogan, C.B (ed.) The London Stage, 1660–1800: Volume V. Southern Illinois University Press, 1968.

1796 plays
Tragedy plays
West End plays
Plays by Robert Jephson